J.M. Forbes & Co. is a private investment firm based in Boston, Massachusetts, US. It was founded by John Murray Forbes in 1838. 

The firm is mentioned by Ruth Paine as having managed her husband Michael Paine's "trust fund" from the Forbes family in an interview for the 2022 film The Assassination & Mrs. Paine.

References

Companies based in Boston
Financial services companies established in 1838
Beacon Hill, Boston
Forbes family